Taufstein is a mountain volcano of Hesse, Germany.

References

Mountains of Hesse